Julien (Jean) Perrichon (6 November 1566 – c.1600) was a French composer and lutenist of the late Renaissance. He was a lute player for Henry IV of France and famous enough to be mentioned by Marin Mersenne in Harmonie universelle (1636) as one of the finest musicians of the preceding age.

He was born in Paris. His father, Jehan Perrichon, was a viol and shawm player, also for the royal court. As a child Jehan probably learned to play the lute from the king's renowned lutenist, Vaumesnil. Court records mention him as a student of the lute from 1576 to 1578, at which time he was likely studying with Jean de la Fontaine or Samuel de La Roche, who were then the king's lutenists. While Perrichon's life has not yet been the subject of a scholarly study, records indicate he was formally the valet de chambre to Henry IV sometime before 1595, a position he likely retained until his early death around 1600; neither the details of his employment nor the circumstances of his death are yet known.

All of Perrichon's surviving music is for lute. It includes dances in the prevailing styles, such as courantes, galliards, voltas, as well as preludes. Most of his music was published after his death, and it attained unusually wide distribution, appearing in Germany and England as well as his native France. Michael Praetorius included his music in a collection in Germany, mentioning in prose his high quality as a composer. John Dowland included some of his music in an English collection, inadvertently attributing it to his father Jehan.

Media

Bibliography

References 

1566 births
1600s deaths
16th-century classical composers
Composers for lute
Renaissance composers
French lutenists
French classical composers
French male classical composers